Fagam is a town and state constituency under Gwaram local government area in Jigawa State, Nigeria.

Geography
  It is 55 km southwest of Azare and 15 km southwest of Foggo along the Jama'are River, also known as the Bunga River.

References

Populated places in Jigawa State